Palermo is a barrio (neighbourhood or district) of Montevideo, Uruguay.

Location
Palermo shares borders with Barrio Sur to the west, Cordón to the north and Parque Rodó to the east, while to the south it borders the coastline, with Rambla República de Argentina running along it.

Landmarks
It is home to the Arts and Trades School, ALADI and the Edificio Mercosur, seat of the parliament of the Mercosur member countries.

Places of worship
 Church and convent of St. Anthony and St. Clare (Roman Catholic, Friars Minor Capuchin) 
 Parish Church of Our Lady of the Orchard and St. Joseph (Roman Catholic)

See also 
Barrios of Montevideo

External links 

 Intendencia de Montevideo / Historia del Sur y Palermo
 Revista Raices / Historia del barrio Palermo

Notes 

 
Barrios of Montevideo